Future Forum is a generational caucus of Millennial and Gen Z members of Congress serving in the U.S. House of Representatives. Future Forum is chaired by Representative Darren Soto in the 117th Congress. The organization was founded in April 2015 by Representative Eric Swalwell. The caucus consists of 37 Members of Congress who represent congressional districts across the country. Future Forum's vice-chairs are Representatives Colin Allred, Haley Stevens and Sara Jacobs.

Mission
The mission of the caucus is to address issues important to millennial and Generation Z Americans, such as college affordability, entrepreneurship, job opportunities, and climate change. Future Forum's work is guided by three core principles: Bridging the divide between young Americans and their government, engaging with and empowering young voters, and inspiring the next generation of leaders in public service. Since its inception, Future Forum members have traveled to more than 50 cities to meet with young Americans where they live, work and go to school—at universities and community colleges, business incubators, job training centers, cafes, and breweries.

Future Forum Youth Congress
Every year, Future Forum holds their Inaugural Future Forum Youth Congress led by Chairman Darren Soto (FL-09) and Executive Director Bill Rockwood. The Youth Congress gives participants a chance to spend two days with fellow young Americans exploring the inner workings of Congress.

Participants are each assigned a committee appointment and two bills, based on areas of interest indicated by youth representatives. Committees include Judiciary, Education and Labor, and Energy and Commerce. To mirror the Congressional experience, bills are preassigned and considered priorities to young citizens. To gain experience in the debate process, students are asked to provide testimony in a legislative hearing - one in favor of an assigned bill and one in opposition to an assigned bill. Participants get the chance to provide remarks and are responsible for votes during the committee hearing.

Task Forces
As of the 117th Congress, the Future Forum Caucus has the Economy Task Force, the Climate Change Task Force, the Health Care Reform Task Force, the Education Task Force, the Social Justice Task Force, and the Immigration Task Force. The Economy Task Force is co-chaired by Colin Allred and Haley Stevens to push for legislation involving new technologies and innovations. The Climate Change Task Force is chaired by Nanette Diaz Barragán and Mike Levin to research impacts of climate change and how it impacts future generations. The Health Care Reform Committee is co-chaired by Lauren Underwood and Chris Pappas to advocate for legislation addressing the impacts of health care on millennials and Generation Z. The Education Task Force is co-chaired by Sara Jacobs and Jimmy Gomez to ensure proper funding and supplies for public schools in the United States. The Social Justice Task Force is co-chaired by Sharice Davids and Joe Neguse to push for legislation and solutions that addresses the socioeconomic issues important to millennials and Generation Z. The Immigration Task Force co-chaired by Ruben Gallego and Grace Meng promote solutions on issues facing the United States immigration system.

Leadership
 117th Congress (2021-2023)
 Darren Soto, (FL-10), Chair
 Colin Allred (TX-32), Vice-chair
 Haley Stevens (MI-11), Vice-chair
 Sara Jacobs (CA-53), Vice-chair
 Stephanie Murphy, (FL-07), Chair Emeritus
 116th Congress (2019-2021)
 Stephanie Murphy, (FL-07), Chair
 Abby Finkenauer (IA-01), Vice-chair
 Jimmy Gomez (CA-34), Vice-chair
 Antonio Delgado (NY-19), Vice-chair
 Eric Swalwell (CA-15), Chairman Emeritus
 115th Congress (2017-2019)
 Eric Swalwell (CA-15), Chair
 Ruben Gallego (AZ-07), Communications Vice-chair
 Seth Moulton (MA-06), Policy Vice-chair
 Stephanie Murphy (FL-07), New Member Vice-chair

Current membership
As of the 117th Congress, the Future Forum Caucus has 37 members. All current members caucus with the Democratic Party.
The members are listed by last name:

Pete Aguilar (CA-31)
Colin Allred (TX-32)
Jake Auchincloss (MA-4)
Nanette Barragan (CA-44)
Brendan Boyle (PA-13)
Joaquin Castro (TX-20)
Angie Craig (MN-02)
Jason Crow (CO-06)
Sharice Davids (KS-03)
Antonio Delgado (NY-19)
Lizzie Fletcher (TX-07)
Ruben Gallego (AZ-07)
Jimmy Gomez (CA-34)
Josh Gottheimer (NJ-05)
Josh Harder (CA-10)
Steven Horsford (NV-04)
Sara Jacobs (CA-53)
Derek Kilmer (WA-06)
Andy Kim (NJ-03)
Raja Krishnamoorthi (IL-08)
Mike Levin (CA-49)
Grace Meng (NY-06)
Seth Moulton (MA-06)
Stephanie Murphy (FL-07)
Joe Neguse (CO-02)
Chris Pappas (NH-01)
Katie Porter (CA-45)
Raul Ruiz (CA-36)
Michael San Nicolas (GU)
Eric Swalwell (CA-15)
Darren Soto (FL-09)
Haley Stevens (MI-11)
Ritchie Torres (NY-15)
Lori Trahan (MA-03)
Lauren Underwood (IL-14)

Former Members
Anthony Brindisi (NY-22)
Joe Cunningham (SC-01)
Tulsi Gabbard (HI-02)
Kendra Horn (OK-05)
Hakeem Jeffries (NY-08)
Joseph Kennedy III (MA-04)
Ben Ray Lujan (NM-03)
Ben McAdams (UT-04)
Debbie Mucarsel-Powell (FL-26)
Max Rose (NY-11)
Mikie Sherrill (NJ-11)
Elissa Slotkin (MI-08)
Abigail Spanberger (VA-07)
Greg Stanton (AZ-09)
Xochitl Torres Small (NM-02)
Marc Veasey (TX-33)
Ilhan Omar (MN-05)

References

2015 establishments in the United States
Caucuses of the United States Congress
Factions in the Democratic Party (United States)
Generation Z